Chrysoritis beaufortius, the Beaufort opal, is a butterfly of the family Lycaenidae found only in South Africa.

The wingspan is 32–36 mm for males and 32–38 mm for females. The flight period is from August to February in one brood.

Larvae feed on Dimorphotheca cuneata. They are associated with Crematogaster peringueyi ants.

Subspecies
Chrysoritis beaufortius beaufortius – South Africa: Western Cape
Chrysoritis beaufortius charlesi (Dickson, 1970) – South Africa: Northern Cape
Chrysoritis beaufortius stepheni (Dickson, 1978) – South Africa: Northern Cape
Chrysoritis beaufortius sutherlandensis Heath & Pringle, 2007 – South Africa: Northern Cape

References

Butterflies described in 1966
Chrysoritis
Endemic butterflies of South Africa